The 1948 Victorian Football Association season was the 67th season of the Australian rules football competition. The premiership was won by the Brighton Football Club, which defeated Williamstown by nine points in the Grand Final on 9 October. It was the first and only Division 1 premiership won by the club in its time in the Association as either Brighton or Caulfield.

Premiership
The home-and-home season was played over twenty matches, before the top four clubs contested a finals series under the Page–McIntyre system to determine the premiers for the season.

Ladder

Finals

Awards
 The leading goalkicker for the home-and-home season was Ray Potter (Preston), who kicked 84 goals in the season.
 The J. J. Liston Trophy was won by Rus McIndoe (Brighton), who polled 44 votes. Jack Blackman (Preston) was second with 38 votes and Reg Shaw (Brunswick) was third with 28 votes.
 Williamstown won the seconds premiership. Williamstown 15.16 (106) defeated Oakleigh 14.18 (102) in the Grand Final, played as a curtain raiser to the firsts Grand Final on 9 October.

Notable events
 On 26 June, Sandringham 11.11 (77) defeated Coburg 9.20 (74); but, Coburg protested the result due to a timekeeping error which had resulted in the final quarter being played five minutes short. The Association quashed the result of the match, and determined that a replay should be played if the match were to have an influence on the final four. Both teams were ultimately well out of finals contention, so the replay was not held, and the teams are credited with playing only nineteen matches for the season.
 Prahran played most of its home matches at Elsternwick Park during the year, sharing the ground with Brighton, because Toorak Park was unavailable due to top-dressing after the first few weeks of the season.
 Preston missed the finals on percentage, after losing its last home-and-home match to wooden-spooner Yarraville by one point, 16.10 (106) def. by 15.17 (107).
 The 1948 VFL Grand Final was drawn, so the Association Grand Final was played on the same day as the League Grand Final Replay. The Association considered postponing its Grand Final by a week to avoid competing for the gate, but the motion was defeated 12–8.

External links
 List of VFA/VFL premiers

References

Victorian Football League seasons
VFL